Juggernaut Books (informally Juggernaut) is digital book publishing house headquartered in New Delhi, India. The publisher emphasizes on short length books written by new writers. It also allows writers to self-publish their books through their digital platform. The digital books are distributed via their website and mobile apps. They also power the content library (around 70,000 books) of the Airtel Books app by Airtel. They also publish physical books, which are distributed and warehoused by Hachette India.

History  
The publishing house was founded by Durga Raghunath and Chiki Sarkar in September 2015.

Before co-founding Juggernaut, Sarkar was a publisher of Penguin India and founder-publisher of Random House India. Raghunath was the CEO of Network18 Digital, senior VP-Growth, at Zomato and also founded Firstpost.

Juggernaut raised Rs 15 crores in its initial round of seed funding from Fab India's founder William Bissell; former CEO and co-founder of Infosys, Nandan Nilekani and MD of Boston Consulting Group, Neeraj Aggarwal.

In April 2016, Juggernaut launched India's first mobile-publishing application. Priya Ramani was appointed as the editor-at-large for its digital properties in the same year. In February 2017, Raghunath resigned from the post of CEO and decided to continue as a shareholder. Simran Khara is the current CEO of the publishing house.

In December 2017, Bharti Airtel acquired a strategic stake in the house. In March 2019, American publishing house HarperCollins joined in a partnership with Juggernaut Books, becoming their sales, distribution partner.

Self-publishing platform 
Juggernaut writing platform is a self-publishing platform of the publishing house that allows writers to self-publish their books by uploading the texts and book cover through their app and website. The publisher also runs a programme named "Juggernaut Selects" that identifies and develops five new writers every month and provides them all the benefits of a publishing house.

Awards 
In 2018, the book Jasmine Days by writer Benyamin published from Juggernaut Books won the inaugural JCB Prize and Crossword translation award. In the same year, Swati Chaturvedi won the London Press Freedom Award for Courage for her book I am a Troll: Inside the Secret World of the BJP's Digital Army published from Juggernaut Books.

Controversy 
On 4 August 2017, Delhi High Court imposed a ban on publication and sale of book Godman to Tycoon: The Untold Story of Baba Ramdev from Juggernaut Books written by Priyanka Pathak Narain based on Ramdev's life. After a legal battle with Ramdev, the ex-parte interim injunction was lifted from the book on 28 April 2018.

In 2018, the book The Burning Forest: India's war in Bastar published from Juggernaut books, written by Delhi University professor Nandini Sundar based on Maoist insurgency and the violence in Bastar was dropped from the department's syllabus. Sundar was also indicted in a murder case filed by a woman called Vimla Baghel of her husband, a Maoist activist. But in February 2019, the professor was cleared of murder charges by police.

Authors 

The following authors are published by Juggernaut

 William Dalrymple
Adrian Levy
Poomani
Matthew Ragget
Gita Gopinath
Rujuta Diwekar
Raghuram Rajan
Abhijit Banerjee
Esther Duflo
 Abdullah Khan (author)
 Arundhati Roy
 Twinkle Khanna
Tony Joseph
 Sourav Ganguly
 Rajdeep Sardesai
 Shyam Saran
 Nandini Sundar
 Sunny Leone
 Perumal Murugan
 Yashwant Sinha
 Murali K Menon
 Rajat Gupta 
 Devyani Khobragade
 Srividya Srinivasan
 Kanhaiya Kumar
 Rohith Vemula
 Meena Kandasamy
 Thant Myint-U
Pankaj Mishra
Ashutosh Nadkar
Shwetabh Gangwar
Deepti Kapoor

References

Ebook suppliers
Ebook sources
Online publishing companies
Self-publishing companies
Book publishing companies of India
2015 establishments in Delhi
Publishing companies established in 2015
Companies based in New Delhi
Organizations established in 2015